Newcastle Stadium is a greyhound racing and former motorcycle speedway stadium, located on The Fossway, Byker, Newcastle. Racing at the stadium takes place on Tuesdays, Wednesdays, Thursdays and Saturdays. The circumference of the track is 415 metres. Until mid-2022, speedway racing took place from March to October.

The stadium used to be known as Brough Park until it changed its name to Newcastle Stadium and is now owned by the Arena Racing Company.

Speedway

Greyhound racing

Competitions 
Northern Flat
All England Cup
Northern Puppy Derby

Origins and opening 
The site chosen in 1928 was the area near Walker that was undergoing extensive change at the time; the stadium plot had previously contained garden allotments and the north section of a football ground. The stadium was constructed just south of the Fossway, east of Tunstall Avenue and west of the large garden allotments that ran alongside Roman Way. The resident kennels were constructed right next to the Fossway and sat directly on the route of Hadrian's Wall. The kennels were very large and accommodated the greyhounds that would supply both Brough Park and Gosforth in later years. On the south side of these kennels was the tracks third and fourth bends. The stadium had a main stand on the home straight with licensed club facilities and a smaller stand on the back straight, also with licensed club facilities. In addition to the stands there were several tote buildings located on the home straight and between bends three and four next to the tote indicator and coffee bar.

Brough Park became the second greyhound stadium in Newcastle because the Tyneside Sports Stadium Ltd opened a track to the south of Scotswood Bridge called the White City Stadium just 28 days previous. The opening night was on 23 June 1928 with the first ever race being won by a greyhound called Marvin at odds of 3-1.

20th Century History 
In 1938 the All England Cup was introduced and the significant prize money attracted many of the top greyhounds from London and the south. As with many tracks the war soon interrupted the regular racing. The surface was described as a good grass track, 430 yards in circumference with distances of 295, 500 & 520 yards with an inside Sledge-Trackless hare. The 500 yard distance had recently replaced 480 yards and a rarely seen centre green hare controller was in operation (the vast majority of tracks drove the hare from a home straight position). Two more competitions called the Northumberland Stakes and Northumberland Cup were introduced.

In 1946 Brough Park experienced the unique situation where during the 1946 running of the All England Cup all four national Derby champions competed. The English Greyhound Derby champion Mondays News, Irish Greyhound Derby winner Lilac Luck, Scottish Greyhound Derby winner Lattin Pearl and Welsh Greyhound Derby champion Negro's Lad all lined up for the event. The hope that all four would progress to the final failed to materialise but Mondays News and Lattin Pearl did finish first and second in the final.

During the fifties the Racing Manager was Mr Greeves and he officiated during the period when greyhounds such as Endless Gossip and Just Fame claimed victory in the All England Cup. As the sixties arrived the track underwent considerable changes including new ownership and management. In 1964 the Totalisators and Greyhound Holdings (TGH) became owners of stadium followed by a new General Manager in Dan McCormick and Racing Manager Mr R Slater. The hare was switched to an outside Navan type with racing held on Thursday and Saturday evenings. Distances were 525, 650, 700, 750 and 880 yards including hurdles over 525 yards.

In 1967 Norman Oliver secured the 1967 Scottish Greyhound Derby with Hi Ho Silver. This started a great run of form for the kennels as Shady Begonia reached the 1968 English Greyhound Derby final one year later as well as securing the Television trophy title. In 1969 Shady Begonia won the Regency. In 1971 Ramdeen Stuart (trained by Oliver) won the classic races the St Leger and Gold Collar; other successes were the Stewards Cup, Ben Truman Stakes and Scottish St Leger.

Trainer Bill Raggatt steered Cute Caddie to a Stow Marathon victory in 1973 and Norman Oliver was voted Greyhound Trainer of the Year in 1973 but Patricias Hope stopped Ramdeen Stuart from taking Greyhound of the Year.

1974 brought about new owners to Brough Park as the TGH which included Crayford & Bexleyheath, Gosforth and Leeds was taken over by Ladbrokes. New joint Racing Managers were Tony Smith and Paul Richardson and the new Director of Racing for Ladbrokes was Arthur Aldridge. The stadium underwent improvements with a new restaurant. Three years later in 1977 a new competition was inaugurated and was called the Trainers Championship, this involved a series races with greyhounds from the top six trainers in the country. Brough Park was chosen as the very first venue that saw a tie between Natalie Savva and Geoff De Mulder.

In 1980 the track changed from grass to sand and Bill Hughes became Racing Manager. The future became uncertain when Ladbrokes decide to sell the track in 1983 to Glassedin Greyhounds Ltd; the company was headed by James Glass father of trainer Jane Glass. The kennels were sold for redevelopment into the Brough Park trading estate and soon after in 1984 the track changed hands from Glassedin Greyhounds Ltd to Bernard and Joan Neesham. Just two years later Kevin Wilde headed a management team that leased the track and then he bought the track from the Neeshams in September 1986. The legendary Scurlogue Champ won the 1986 Television Trophy at the track. Jubilee Rebecca won the 1994 Television Trophy for trainer Gordon Rooks.

21st Century History 
A major milestone and turning point for the track arrived in 2003. William Hill bookmakers purchased the track which then underwent major investment similar to that of Sunderland Greyhound Stadium whom William Hill had acquired the year before. A rebranding took place in 2007 and because the track was the only one left in Newcastle the decision was made to rename the stadium from Brough Park to Newcastle. The investment in the new facilities and track was rewarded with selection as the host of the Television Trophy in 2009 and Newcastle under Operations Manager Ian Walton and Racing Manager Paul Twinn have seen the standard of greyhounds become one of the best in the country.

Jimmy Wright scored a double success in 2010 when Target Classic picked up the William Hill Classic and England Expects lifted the William Hill Grand Prix on the same evening. Elwick Chris trained by Michael Walsh won the Laurels in 2010 and Droopys Hester won the Champion Stakes one year later. In 2012 Newcastle won the BAGS/SIS Track Championship.

In May 2017 the Arena Racing Company (ARC) acquired both Sunderland Greyhound Stadium and Newcastle Greyhound Stadium from William Hill. The stadium gained one of the sports most prestigious competitions the Laurels in 2017 from the GRA. There is now renewed hope that the competition may regain its category 1 status and increase its prize fund. 

In 2017 Angela Harrison took over the trainer's licence and Newcastle contract from Jimmy Wright and in 2018 the stadium signed a deal with their parent company ARC to race every Wednesday lunchtime, Thursday evening and every Friday and Saturday afternoon.

Droopys Verve trained by Angela Harrison finished runner-up in the 2018 English Greyhound Derby and Droopys Expert reached the 2019 English Greyhound Derby final. Harrison also secured the 2019 British Trainers Championship at Sheffield.

In 2021 the stadium held the Northern Flat following the closure of Belle Vue Stadium.

Track records

Current

Former (post-metric)

Former (pre-metric)

References 

Greyhound racing venues in the United Kingdom
Sports venues in Newcastle upon Tyne
Defunct speedway venues in England